Mathews House can refer to:
(sorted by state, then city/town)

 Mathews House (Paonia, Colorado), listed on the National Register of Historic Places (NRHP) in Delta County, Colorado
 Lockwood–Mathews Mansion, Norwalk, Connecticut, a National Historic Landmark listed on the NRHP in Fairfield County, Connecticut
 John Frank Mathews Plantation, Prattsburg, Georgia, listed on the NRHP in Talbot County, Georgia
 Courtney Mathews House, Lexington, Kentucky, listed on the NRHP in Fayette County, Kentucky
 Nathan Mathews House and Mathews Cotton Gin, West Point, Mississippi, listed on the NRHP in Clay County, Mississippi
 David Mathews House, Hoosick, New York, listed on the NRHP in Rensselaer County, New York and Bennington County, Vermont
 Mathews House (Painesville, Ohio), listed on the NRHP in Lake County, Ohio
 Nelson and Margret Mathews House, Coburg, Oregon, listed on the NRHP in Lane County, Oregon
 G. A. Mathews House, Brookings, South Dakota, listed on the NRHP in Sanborn County, South Dakota
 Mathews–Powell House, Queen City, Texas, listed on the NRHP in Cass County, Texas

See also
 Matthews House (disambiguation)